This is a timeline of the COVID-19 pandemic in Saskatchewan.

The province of Saskatchewan reported its first positive COVID-19 tests on March 12, 2020. , Saskatchewan ranks fifth amongst provinces and territories in terms of overall cases.

2020

March 
On March 12, Saskatchewan's Chief Medical Officer Saqib Shahab announced the first presumptive case of in the province: a person in their 60s that had recently returned from Egypt, who was tested on March 9, and was in self-isolation at their home. By March 16, the number of presumptive cases in the province had increased to seven. On March 17, one new case was reported. On the same day, the College of Dental Surgeons of Saskatchewan recommended that those who attended the 2020 Pacific Dental Conference in Vancouver to self-isolate after many cases, including two in Saskatchewan, were linked to the event.

Subsequent new cases:

 March 18 — 8 new cases were reported.
 March 19 — 4 new cases were reported, bringing the provincial total to 20.
 March 20 — 6 new cases were reported, and 8 were confirmed.
 March 21 — 18 new cases were reported, including 11 healthcare workers who attended a physicians' bonspiel at a curling club in Edmonton from March 11 to 14. The index case was reported to be a physician from Saskatchewan who had contracted COVID-19 in Las Vegas.
 March 23 — 14 new cases were reported, and only one was still presumptive.
 March 24 — 6 new confirmed cases were reported, totalling 72 confirmed cases. This includes four cases thought to possibly be the result of community transmission, pending a full investigation. 
 March 25 — Another new 14 cases were announced.
 March 26 and 27  — 9 new cases were reported each (totalling 18 new cases in two days).

On March 28, Saskatchewan announced the province's then-largest single-day increase in cases, at 30. The spike, especially in northern and central Saskatchewan, was attributed to 18 cases involving attendees of a snowmobile rally in Christopher Lake on March 14. The Saskatchewan Health Authority (SHA) initially announced two positive cases (including a participant, and a server at an associated dinner) on March 25, and advised self-isolation for anyone that had attended.

On March 30, the confirmed case count rose to 176, and Saskatchewan also reported its first deaths from COVID-19. Both people were in their 70s and were from separate parts of the province.

April–May 
By April 6, Saskatchewan had 253 cases and 81 recoveries. For the first time, the number of new recoveries (14) exceeded the number of new cases (4).

On April 8, the SHA released its preliminary modelling data, which had projected "low" and "upper-range" scenarios with between 153,000 and 408,000 cases respectively, and 3,075 to 8,370 deaths respectively. Seven new cases and recoveries were announced the next day. 

The total number of cases continued to rise, reaching 289 on April 11, though the remaining active cases fell to 138—dropping for the first time below the number of recoveries (which rose to 147).

On April 13, Saskatchewan reported 14 recoveries and two new cases (totalling 300). The next day, only one new case was reported, and nine new recoveries.

On April 17, Shahab announced that the province was monitoring cases tied to long-term care facilities, including an "outbreak situation" in La Loche, a second staff member of one in Regina testing positive, and three residents of said home with symptoms (which later tested negative).

On April 18, citing reports of cases linked to the Kearl Oil Sands Project near Fort McMurray, Alberta, the SHA instituted an advisory against non-essential travel between Northwest Saskatchewan and Northern Alberta, and began recommending self-isolation for those returning from inter-provincial travel between the areas. The same day, a curfew between 10 p.m. and 7 a.m. was ordered in La Loche.

On April 21, health officer for North Saskatchewan Rim Zayed stated that the cases in La Loche were "under control". The SHA announced plans to release updated modelling.

On April 23, Premier Scott Moe gave a televised address (the first such address by the Premier of Saskatchewan since Roy Romanow's tenure), announcing that the province had "flattened the curve", and that he and Shahab would unveil a five-stage process to "gradually and methodically" lift restrictions on commerce and services. He explained that the province had to balance the risks of doing so too quickly (which could cause the virus to spread again), and doing so too slowly (which could cause "permanent damage to the livelihoods of thousands of Saskatchewan people"), and that the province was "looking at ways to increase testing and contact tracing in the days ahead". Moe also stated that Saskatchewan was 70% below the national average of cases per-province, and hospitalizations and deaths were 90% below average.

Outbreak in Northern Saskatchewan 
In late-April, the outbreak in La Loche began to intensify, with a major spike in active cases in the "Far North" zone (Division No. 18). The initial cases were eventually traced to the Kearl Oil Sands Project outbreak; a health officer of the Northern Inter-Tribal Health Authority (NITHA) cited that travel between communities was common in Northern Saskatchewan, and that overcrowded living conditions in First Nations communities may have exacerbated its spread.

On April 24, Saskatchewan saw its largest number of new cases since April 8, with 10 (offset by 10 recoveries). In response to the outbreak, Premier Moe stated that despite its overall progress, the province "can expect to experience isolated outbreaks such as this."  That day, Premier Moe announced that non-essential travel into or from the Northern Saskatchewan Administration District (NSAD) would be restricted, enforced by checkpoints along highways leading into the zone. Residents of the area were also advised to avoid non-essential travel between communities.

On April 27, the province announced twelve new cases and a fifth death—an 83-year-old man who was a resident of a long-term care home in La Loche. All but one of the new cases were situated in the Far North zone. Northern Health Officer Zayed stated that almost all of the 29 new cases in La Loche had been traced to a case from northern Alberta. Ryan Meili, leader of the opposition Saskatchewan NDP, called for more action to be taken in the northern region, including "mobiliz[ing] the resources necessary to test everyone in La Loche and Clearwater River Dene Nation." Tracy Zambory, head of the Saskatchewan Union of Nurses, similarly argued that "we're expecting a population that hasn't gotten much help in the past to suddenly understand and follow all these rules."

The SHA released updated modelling on April 28, estimating an effective reproduction number of 0.7 per-case, with the estimated total cases reduced to 254,756, and 3,050 deaths. The next day, Saskatchewan announced 17 new cases, and one new death in the Far North region. Eleven of the new cases were situated in La Loche, and four in Lloydminster—tied to a cluster of 13 at Lloydminster Hospital. Moe therefore announced that both cities would be excluded from the first phase of the lifting of economic restrictions (Re-Open Saskatchewan) on May 4. Although the outbreak was declared the prior Sunday, it was not publicly announced until three days later; Medical Health Officer of the North zone Mandiangu Nsungu explained that "the hope is always that you will control the situation because there is also a balance between sending an alarm to the community too soon. You have to balance that with the negative impact that may result in terms of panic. You have to find the right time to make that announcement in such a way that you actually do not panic the population for not much benefit."

On April 30, a public health order was issued requiring residents of the NSAD to practice appropriate social distancing and not travel outside of their communities, with exceptions only for medical needs and grocery shopping. Individuals with a primary residence in the NSAD were also barred from entering the region. Those travelling to and from the communities of La Ronge and Stony Rapids were initially granted an exception to the travel ban, but they were forbidden from stopping in any other community within the NSAD. La Ronge councillor Jordan McPhail stated on May 3 that the town would request its removal from the exemption, arguing that it created a loophole. Both exemptions were removed on May 6.

On May 1, Saskatchewan surpassed 400 cases in total with its largest single-day increase since March 28, with 19 in the Far North zone and four in the North zone within the Lloydminster area. An outbreak was also declared at Victoria Hospital in Prince Albert, due to a patient having been there for multiple days for unrelated procedures before testing positive on April 30. A previous test and verbal assessment upon the patient's arrival on April 21 had come back negative. There was no evidence of transmission within the hospital. An outbreak was also declared in Beauval, Saskatchewan. 12 new cases were reported on May 3. On May 4, the province announced 34 new confirmed cases—its largest single-day increase in cases to-date, with all but five being within the Far North zone. Premier Moe cited the increased number as evidence that "increased testing in that area is working". SHA CEO Scott Livingstone stated that the positive case at Victoria Hospital was tied to La Loche.

On May 5, federal Chief Public Health Officer Theresa Tam stated that the outbreak in North Saskatchewan was "of concern", due to its remote communities and First Nations populations. 20 new cases were announced, with 18 in the Far North zone, all primarily confined to the northwest (with 5 in La Loche). Due to an employee testing positive, an outbreak was declared at a dairy factory in the Saskatoon zone. 25 new cases were announced the next day, surpassing 500 in total, with all but 3 being in La Loche. A staff member at Meadow Lake Hospital also tested positive.

On May 7, the outbreak at Lloydminster Hospital was deemed stable, and the city was given clearance to enter phase one of the Re-Open Saskatchewan plan on May 11. With 15 new cases, the Far North zone surpassed the Saskatoon zone as having the most individual cases out of all regions defined by the SHA.

On May 9, the Saskatchewan Liquor and Gaming Authority suspended all alcohol sales and distribution in La Loche for two weeks in order to discourage gatherings.

On May 17, the La Loche Health Centre outbreak was declared inactive, as 28 days had passed without new cases directly associated with it.

On May 20, Saskatchewan announced 21 new cases (16 in Far North) and its seventh death, a patient of the North region in their 60s.

On May 19, due to the regional nature of the La Loche outbreak, the interprovincial travel restrictions were reduced to only the northwest corner of the province. (The travel restriction ended in full on June 8.)

On May 26, Saskatchewan announced one new death in the Far North—a woman in her 50s—and no new confirmed cases.

June 
By June, the number of daily cases had begun to subside once more, although two new deaths were announced in Far North on June 8.

On June 15, 18 new cases were reported, with 13 in the Far North attributed to a wake and funeral in Clearwater River Dene Nation on June 10 and 11. Shahab warned that COVID-19 was still in the province, and that all residents needed to continue taking precautions to reduce the spread of the virus.

On June 17, an outbreak was declared in two Hutterite colonies in the RM of Maple Creek. 14 cases were initially tied to this outbreak. The next day, Shahab stated that the province was working with officials in Alberta to investigate possible ties to inter-provincial travel; the Spring Valley Hutterite Colony in southern Alberta stated that several colonies from Saskatchewan had attended a funeral service it had held for three teenagers who had drowned in a boating accident.

On June 21, Saskatchewan announced 20 new cases—the largest in nearly a month. 18 of these cases were attributed to the outbreak. The SHA announced that it was working with the Hutterian Safety Council (HSC) to facilitate communications and testing efforts within local colonies under its oversight (including those in Saskatchewan and Alberta). In a joint statement on June 22, both groups noted that there had been a false sense of security among some colonies due to their isolated structure, and that "the unfortunate misunderstanding has taken root that positive COVID-19 tests would lead to an economic shutdown of their communities".

On June 23, nine of the 11 new cases announced on June 22 were deducted from Saskatchewan's total case count due to them being from out-of-province residents.

July 
Beginning July 1, 2020, due to a decrease in new cases, the province announced that it would only release new case numbers on weekdays, with case numbers on weekends and statutory holidays held over to the next business day.

On July 2, Saskatchewan's 14th death was announced, a resident of the Far North zone. After an outbreak emerged in the southern community of Warner, Alberta, Alberta Health Services stated that it was investigating whether an exposure may have occurred at the aforementioned June funeral.

On July 7, the province announced its 15th and youngest death to-date, a man in their 20s from the North zone.

On July 13, the province announced that there had been a total of 56 new cases since Friday (2 on Saturday, 23 on Sunday, 31 on Monday). It was stated that the majority of these new cases were in the southwest and west-central regions of the province, listing a series of 11 regional municipalities (unlike previous cases, where the province refused to release such specific details). The SHA stated that it was working with local Hutterite communities to perform additional testing and contact tracing in the affected areas, but did not specifically say how many cases were related to the previous Maple Creek outbreak beyond that they were tied to "communal living conditions" and "active case finding", and about 10 were tied to "sporadic events and contacts".

On July 15, the SHA warned of an "emergent situation in the southwest and central west areas of the province", including Swift Current and surrounding rural municipalities, with a heightened risk of public transmission. In response to public concern, and criticism by the opposition NDP amid the spike, Premier Moe announced that the SHA would return to releasing updates on weekends and holidays.

On July 16, Saskatchewan announced 42 new cases, its largest single-day increase to-date, surpassing 900 cases in total, and going back above 100 active cases. 

On July 22, Saskatchewan surpassed its single-day record with 60 new cases. 50 of these cases are within the South zone; 48 of these were tied to Hutterite colonies in western Saskatchewan, and all but 5 were within a single colony in Lawtonia. The province stated that there were currently 17 Hutterite colonies with active cases, and that it was working with the colonies to implement localized restrictions on non-essential travel. The same day, the last active case in La Loche was declared recovered, ending the outbreak that had occurred there.

On July 28, the HSC displayed concerns over the SHA's identification of specific colonies with COVID-19 cases, citing that its specific references to the group or euphemistic language had created a negative stigma.

The province reached a new peak of 322 active cases on July 29.

As of July 30, Saskatchewan had the highest rate of new cases per-capita out of all provinces over the past seven days. That day, Saskatchewan announced its 18th death, 38 new cases, and 55 new recoveries. Premier Moe stated that although most did, there were still some colonies that had not cooperated with the province's guidance.

August to September 
The outbreaks subsided in late-August 2020; with an increase in the number of new recoveries, by August 28 Saskatchewan had the lowest number of active cases per-capita in Western Canada, and the lowest seven-day average per-capita outside of Atlantic Canada.

On September 2, health officials reiterated their discouragement of travel outside of Saskatchewan, citing increasing cases in Alberta and Manitoba. Premier Moe stated that Saskatchewan was working with the federal government to possibly support the national COVID Alert Exposure Notification app.

As of September 16, 21 new cases in Saskatoon were linked to a gathering on September 13.

In late-September, outbreaks were declared in Yorkton due to increased community transmission.

October 
On October 1, the SHA restricted access to long-term care homes and hospitals in the Yorkton area.

On October 7, the SHA declared a multi-jurisdictional outbreak due to six cases tied to events held at Full Gospel Outreach Centre in Prince Albert from September 14 through October 4, with at least 100 contacts identified "from multiple areas across the province". The SHA stated that this outbreak was expected to lead to a spike of cases in the North and Far North zones, and advised attendees of the events to self-isolate and contact local health officials if they did not comply with public health guidance while attending. The church was fined $14,000 ($10,000 fine and $4,000 victim surcharge) for violating a public health order issued pursuant to a state of emergency.

The province announced 34 cases—its largest increase since July 30—on October 10, and stated that 13 of the current active cases in the north were tied to this outbreak. This was surpassed on October 12 with 48 new cases, with the province citing that public and private gatherings had been a factor in these increases.

On October 13, citing a "dramatic increase" in cases, Shabab announced that the number of participants in private gatherings at homes would be restricted to 15 people effective October 16.

By October 16, 79 cases had been attributed to the Full Gospel Outreach events. Shahab stated that there had been an increasing number of cases among younger residents, and that the province was taking steps to improve its communications strategy to target teens and young adults via social media platforms. He also stated that the province did not necessarily plan to reintroduce further restrictions unless the province had 60 cases per-day.

On October 17, the province surpassed 326 active cases, its highest to-date.

On October 19, the province announced its largest number of new cases to-date, at 66. The majority of these cases were reported to be in the Saskatoon and North Central (including Prince Albert) area, and it was stated that many of the new Saskatoon cases had been traced to bars and nightclubs in the area. The SHA issued an advisory regarding possible exposure at the Divas Nightclub in Saskatoon on October 9, the same night that a video was recorded showing defiance of social distancing on a dance floor at the location.

On October 23, it was stated that at least 37 cases had been linked to an exposure at the Longbranch country bar in Saskatoon (which had been the subject of possible exposure on October 8, and had earlier promoted the addition of plexiglass-enclosed "Redneck Dance Cubes" for groups as a workaround to a prohibition on dance floors). Shahab stated that the province was "not currently at a point where we can look at slowdowns or lockdowns",  unless the number of cases continues to intensify.

On October 24, the province surpassed its daily record with 78 new cases, including 33 in Saskatoon and 21 in Regina. At least 47 cases had been tied to the Longbranch, and 22 to Divas.

On October 27, it was reported that Saskatchewan had the fourth-highest rate of new cases per-capita among Canada's provinces and territories.

November 
On November 3, a mask mandate for indoor public spaces was announced for Prince Albert, Regina, and Saskatoon, as well as a further reduction of the maximum number of participants in a private home gathering from 15 to 10.

From November 7 to 9, Saskatchewan reported new deaths for three consecutive days. Active cases exceeded 1,000, while the province set a new single-day record of 190 new cases on November 9.

On November 12, with hospitalizations reaching 49 and its sixth consecutive day of over 100 new cases, the SHA stated that the province would announce "additional public health measures" on November 13. Opposition Leader Meili called for Premier Moe and the provincial government to "act with sufficient force" to prevent a second lockdown, including a province-wide mask mandate, and cooperation with officials in Alberta and Manitoba.

On November 13, Saskatchewan announced a number of new health measures, including an extension and expansion of the mask mandate to include all communities with a population above 5,000. The next day, Saskatchewan announced its largest number of new cases to-date, at 308 (which included samples whose deliveries were delayed due to snowstorms earlier in the week).

On November 17, as the province surpassed 2,000 active cases with 240 new cases (its second-largest increase to-date), and reached 71 hospitalizations, Premier Moe announced additional measures—described as a "significant one-month slowdown". Moe stated that he wanted to avoid a lockdown (as in Manitoba), as it would impact the economy and jobs. Under the measures, the mask mandate would be extended province-wide on November 19. In addition, the maximum number of participants in private at-home gatherings would be further-reduced to 5, and visitation of long-term care facilities would again be restricted. Moe hoped to loosen these measures in time for the holiday season if they are effective at slowing the heightened rate of new cases, and explained that "we have too many new cases, we have too many in intensive care, and we need to do what we can to get these numbers down." The province also stated that it was consulting with athletics organizations, gym owners, the hospitality industry, and religious leaders on enhancements to existing guidelines.

Updated modeling was released on November 19, projecting in a best-case scenario (where 60% of residents complied with the wearing of face masks, 20% participated in weekly social gatherings of five people, half the population worked from home, residents only visited grocery stores weekly, and business at bars and restaurants was one quarter of historic levels) that there would be 34 additional deaths and 4,830 additional cases over the next six months. Shahab urged continued compliance with government health orders and guidance, as "It’s not just a few of us that need to do our part. It’s all of us." Health Minister Paul Merriman reported that contact tracing was becoming increasingly difficult in Saskatoon, requiring federal assistance, and warned that "the pandemic will only end when we have widespread access to a safe and effective vaccine".

Another single-day record was set on November 21, with 439 new reported cases, hospitalizations reaching 93, and the seven-day rolling average at 203. The province stated that case counts could continue to fluctuate due to winter weather and other logistical issues causing delays in the delivery of test samples. Moe stated that the province was continuing to consider additional measures.

On November 22, in response to an interview with Premier Moe on The Roy Green Show where he defended his decision to only do so as a last resort, Opposition Leader Meili called for a three-week lockdown. He argued that "[Moe] doesn't have a good understanding of what's going on. He's in over his head and he's making the wrong choices and we're all going to pay for it."

On November 24, the SHA released data showing that sports and indoor recreation (25%) and gatherings (17%) were the largest known sources of recent infections out-of-home. The SHA therefore announced the next day that capacity restrictions for indoor gatherings and recreational facilities would be tightened, with indoor event and entertainment venues limited to 30 people, restrictions on the capacity of bars and restaurants (implemented via group size restrictions and social distancing requirements for table positioning), and the suspension of all group and team sports activity (besides practices in limited groups) from November 27 through at least December 17. Shabab stated that cases tied to sports were becoming "frequent", especially in children's sports, and that he had concerns that they were being imported into schools and workplaces.

Transmission within Saskatchewan's prison system was also determined; on November 26, 72 of the 299 new cases were among inmates (68) and staff of the Saskatoon Provincial Correctional Centre (SPCC). It was therefore announced that the SPCC would redirect all new inmates to either Prince Albert or Regina, and that they will be tested for COVID-19 before arrival. Masks also became mandatory for all inmates at Saskatchewan corrections facilities.

December 
By December 3, 2020, the province had surpassed 4,000 active cases. The SHA announced plans to "slow down" some of its services (particularly diagnostics, some elective surgeries and home care) and redeploy 588 of its full-time workers in order to meet demand, citing models projecting major increases in cases and hospitalization within the next two weeks. On December 8, 2020, the province recorded a single-day record of six new deaths.

On December 9, 2020, the SHA announced plans to begin a phased rollout of COVID-19 vaccines, beginning with the Pfizer‑BioNTech COVID‑19 vaccine (approved by Health Canada earlier that day), and initially targeting health care workers and high-risk populations. Shahab stated that residents would be able to "get closer to our normal routines" once mass immunization is achieved, but that in the meantime, they would have to continue following all public health orders. The same day, the SHA declared an emergency situation at the Parkside Extendicare long-term care facility in south Regina due to a "severe, widespread outbreak" among residents and staff, with 11 deaths, 149 confirmed cases among residents, and 57 among employees. To assist in managing the outbreak, the SHA took over day-to-day operations of the facility through January 15, 2021.

On December 14, the province announced new restrictions on social gatherings (limiting public outdoor gatherings to 10 people, and prohibiting any private gathering involving people from outside of the immediate household) taking effect December 17, the closure of casinos and bingo halls on December 19, and tightened capacity restrictions for retail stores taking effect December 25. These orders, as well as the orders effective since November 17, would be in effect through at least January 15, 2021.

By December 18,  the death toll of the Parkside outbreak increased to 21. 25 residents of the home were transferred to Regina's Pioneer Village care home, where 19 tested positive and one died. Livingstone cited factors such as outdated ventilation systems, four-bed rooms and low staffing levels as having increased the impact of the outbreak; these had been long-term issues at the facility even before the pandemic, with a 2019 inspection report stating that Parkside "[did] not meet current standards of care or resident and family expectations for a home environment".

2021

January 
On January 4, 2021, Minister of Highways Joe Hargrave announced his resignation, after criticism over a recent trip to Palm Springs, California to finalise the sale of a home there. Hargrave had apologized for the trip, explaining that it had been approved by the Premier, and that "my decision to travel was an error in judgement at a time when so many people have had to make sacrifices during the pandemic."  The NDP questioned whether the travel was essential, especially after the December 31 resignation of Ontario's Finance Minister Rod Phillips amid a similar controversy, but the Saskatchewan government stated that it did not plan to remove Hargrave from office. Opposition Leader Meili argued that "[Premier Moe's] telling the people of Saskatchewan one thing, demanding one thing of Saskatchewan people, but doing something very different when it comes to his own cabinet members."

As of January 11, Saskatchewan had reached its peak of hospitalizations and daily new cases.

On January 12, the existing health orders amended December 14, 2020 were renewed through January 29, with no changes. Saskatchewan's seven-day rolling average peaked at 321 cases per-day. As of January 13, Saskatchewan had the highest number of new cases per-capita nationwide.

On January 15, the province reported that at least 56 cases had been tied to a restaurant in Saskatoon.

On January 23, Premier Moe criticized a group of individuals that had harassed the Chief Medical Officer by participating in a "misguided protest" outside of his personal home. He stated on Twitter, "To those that did this - you should be ashamed of yourselves and your actions. After months of spending virtually every waking hour working tirelessly to protect the health and well being of Saskatchewan people though this pandemic, this is the last thing Dr. Shahab deserves."

On January 26, the existing health orders amended December 14, 2020 were renewed through February 19, again with no changes, with Premier Moe citing that the seven-day rolling average had been seen a gradual decrease.

A study between November 2020 and January 2021 by the University of Saskatchewan's Population Health and Evaluation Research Unit (SPHERU), found that 67% of 1,500 residents surveyed did not believe the current provincial health orders were sufficient.

Over all, January 2021 accounted for nearly half of Saskatchewan's COVID-19-related deaths to-date.

February 
On February 2, 2021, the SHA announced that Lineage B.1.1.7 (the "UK variant"), a variant of concern (VoC), had been detected in two COVID-19 positives in the Regina area originally tested in mid-January, including a person that had recently returned from the United Kingdom, and a close contact. The patients were no longer infectious, and there was no evidence of further transmission. In the wake of the discovery, Premier Moe and Chief Medical Officer Shahab emphasized continued adherence to the current provincial health orders, but it was stated that officials were evaluating the impact of SARS-CoV-2 variants on health care and public health orders. One more case of B.1.1.7 was reported by the SHA on February 4, a resident of Saskatoon who had recently returned from Southeast Asia.

On February 16, the existing health orders amended December 14, 2020, were renewed through March 19, once again with no changes.

By mid-February 2021, the number of daily cases had begun to decline across most of the province. However, test positivity per-capita in Regina had begun to steadily increase, leading to concerns surrounding community transmission of variants.

On February 23, the SHA announced that two additional B.1.1.7 cases had been confirmed in the Regina zone from patients tested late-January, and one presumptive in the Saskatoon zone. The SHA stated that the new B.1.1.7 cases were not believed to be tied to travel. The presumptive case involved an out-of-province acute care patient. The SHA also confirmed that a case involving the 501.V2 variant (the "South African variant") had been detected in the North Central zone, which was still being investigated by health officials.

March 
On March 1, the SHA announced that its provincial laboratory in Regina had been validated to perform whole genome sequencing for SARS-CoV-2 variants.

In a press briefing on March 2, Moe suggested that the province may announce an ease of restrictions as early as next week. Shahab stated that hospitalizations and the number of cases per 100,000 had been trending downwards (although Saskatchewan still led the country in active cases per-capita). In regards to the spike in Regina, Shahab said that it was still undetermined whether community spread of variants was causing the increase.

On March 8, the province reported two additional B.1.1.7 cases in Regina and one in the North West zone, and confirmed the presumptive case reported on February 23. Test positivity in Regina had reached 12.8%, in comparison to 5.5% province-wide.

On March 9, the province announced a partial loosening of health orders; families may form a social bubble with one or two other consistent households, no larger than ten people, and beginning March 19, worship services would be allowed to expand from 30 to 150 attendees. The province also announced 35 new variant cases, primarily B.1.1.7, from a survey of 190 positive cases from between January 26 and February 27 by the provincial lab.

On March 12, 2021, the SHA reported that 77 cases in Regina carried a mutation identified via single nucleotide polymorphism (SNP) screenings being performed on all COVID-19-positive samples (which identify the presence of a mutation, but not the lineage; until March 16 these were reported in government statistics as a "presumptive positive"). The SHA issued an advisory regarding increased community transmission of variants of concern in the Regina area, including a recommendation against non-essential shopping and travel, advising residents over the age of 50 to reconsider expanding household bubbles, and that stating that public health measures may be considered if the number of variant cases do not decline. Medical Health Officer Maurice Hennink stated that at least 70-80% of cases recently sequenced had tested for a variant.

On March 16, 2021, the SHA reported 101 new confirmed cases in the Regina area (out of 156 province-wide), 61 new confirmed variant cases (a total of 136), and 186 new "presumptive" variant cases. The existing health orders amended December 14, 2020 were renewed through April 5. Besides the Regina area being excluded from the planned increase in capacity for worship services until at least April 5, and a recommendation that residents avoid non-essential travel into or out of the Regina area, no further restrictions were announced. Mayor of Regina Sandra Masters stated that "many of our outbreaks are a result of people going to work [...] going into public places and household gathering[s] while symptomatic", and that the actions she could take were limited due to jurisdictional limits.

Public health orders in Regina and area 
On March 23, the opposition NDP called for a two-week circuit breaker in Regina and surrounding communities, including the closure of dine-in restaurants, encouraging remote work, and prohibiting household gatherings. Health Critic Vicki Mowat stated that such measures would "help get case numbers under control and prevent hospitals from being overwhelmed while the vaccines are deployed." The province reported that there was a total of 360 variant cases confirmed to-date via sequencing and 891 confirmed via SNP screening.

Later that day, the province announced a series of targeted public health orders for Regina and its surrounding communities. Private indoor gatherings with people from outside of the immediate household were prohibited effective immediately, and dine-in bars and restaurants, and any other "non-essential indoor locations that had limits of 30 individuals" (including indoor arts, event, and entertainment venues), were ordered closed effective 12:01 a.m. CST on March 28, 2021. The city of Regina announced that it would voluntarily close city-run recreational facilities (besides playgrounds) for the duration of the order. In addition, the province announced a formal advisory against non-essential travel into or out of Regina and surrounding communities, and is "strongly recommending" remote work where possible. Premier Moe explained that these measures were intended to help reduce contacts and "slow things down", and would initially apply through at least April 5, but were "very likely" to be extended.

On March 27, the SHA issued advisories for the city of Moose Jaw regarding increased transmission.

On March 30, Premier Moe announced that all existing public health orders, including the newly implemented restrictions in Regina, would be renewed through April 12. Moe and Shahab also urged caution for the Easter holiday weekend, recommending against indoor gatherings (where allowed), especially in the Moose Jaw area and southeastern Saskatchewan. The South Central 2 zone containing Moose Jaw had 106 active cases, with Shahab stating that the city alone accounted for at least 95. The larger South Central region had the second largest number of VoC cases among the regions province-wide, behind only Regina.

While the possibility of extending the stricter public health orders to Moose Jaw had been discussed, Moe argued that this was "not the goal", and Shahab encouraged voluntary compliance. Moe also emphasized vaccination, arguing that increasing numbers of cases among younger residents "speaks to the fact that the vaccines are working," public health orders were "nothing more than a stopgap to buy us time until we get the majority of Saskatchewan residents vaccinated", and that the province aimed for the total number of doses it has administered to-date to roughly double over the next 15–20 days.

April 
On April 5, 2021 there were 47 COVID-19 patients in intensive care, a record high for the third day in a row, with the majority being in Regina. Wastewater surveillance by the University of Saskatchewan also forecast increasing positivity in the Saskatoon area.

On April 6, Health Minister Paul Merriman stated that the province's overall ICU capacity was stable, but that he was still concerned for the situation in Regina. Merriman and Moe also dismissed calls to prioritize essential workers for vaccination, arguing that the strictly age-based approach was the "most efficient and quickest way" to distribute them. On April 7, all current public health orders were renewed through April 26, with no changes.

On April 9, the province reported its largest single-day increase in new cases since January, at 358. On April 12, the province announced that it planned to vaccinate additional essential workers, including health care workers that were not covered under Phase 1 of the initial rollout, first responders via mobile clinics, and the staff of pharmacies and the grocery stores they are attached to. On April 13, the province announced that private home gatherings and the size of worship services would be rolled back outside of Regina, with private household gatherings once again prohibited, and worship services reduced to 30 people. On April 14, the SHA issued an advisory for the Saskatoon area due to increasing VoC transmission, requesting that residents follow all public health orders, work remotely when possible, and not perform non-essential travel to or from the area. 

Also on April 14, the SHA declared a heightened risk of COVID-19 VoC transmission in Davidson, Kindersley, Maple Creek, Rosetown, Swift Current, and Moose Jaw,  due to an outbreak tied to an "outdoor gathering in southwest Saskatchewan". The next day, this advisory was extended to Outlook, and it was stated that the outbreak was tied to a "recreational party" on April 2 in the Maple Creek area, which violated limits on gathering sizes and had minimal adherence to public health orders. The RCMP was investigating the incident. During a council meeting on April 12, mayor of Maple Creek Michelle McKenzie had told the RCMP that she recently had concerns over "excessive partiers" violating the public health orders. McKenzie subsequently announced that she was urging all residents of Maple Creek to follow the public health orders and immediately seek testing if they show any signs of symptoms. On April 16, vaccine eligibility expanded, with bookings for residents 48 years old and older.

On April 20, the province announced that it had sequenced five cases of Lineage P.1 in the South West zone. All current public health orders were renewed through May 10, with no changes. Following similar decisions by other provinces, Saskatchewan announced that it would extend eligibility of the AstraZeneca vaccine to residents 40 and over beginning April 28, and that it will prioritize other frontline workers such as healthcare workers, teachers, police and fire departments, corrections, and border officers.

On April 26, Merriman stated that the province had been prioritizing vaccination in Saskatoon in order to protect the health care system from being overwhelmed due to variants. On April 27, for the first time since the beginning of the current wave, Saskatoon led the province in newly-reported cases, with 70 (as opposed to 30 in Regina).

May 
On May 4, Premier Moe announced plans to begin lifting the current public health orders under a three-step plan, if specific vaccination targets are met. On May 5, Saskatchewan surpassed 500 deaths attributed to COVID-19. On May 6, the test positivity rate fell below 5% for the first time since the end of March.

On May 9, Saskatchewan satisfied the target for Step 1 of the reopening plan, with 71% of adults 40 and over having received at least one vaccine dose. Premier Moe announced per the plan, that it was targeting implementation of Step 1 three weeks from May 9 (May 30).

On May 23, Saskatchewan's seven-day average and hospitalizations reached their lowest levels since mid-April. Active cases had been declining in Regina, while Saskatoon was leading the province's regions in active cases. With second doses beginning the next day for residents 80 and over, the province reached the target of 70% of adults 30 and older with one dose needed in order to qualify for Step 2. Step 1 took effect on May 30.

June 
On June 1, the province recorded only 86 new cases, its smallest increase since February 24. Premier Moe announced that the province would lift its mask mandate and restrictions on larger gatherings in Step 3 if 70% of all residents aged 12 and older receive at least one vaccine dose.

July 
On July 11, Step 3 of the reopening plan took effect, meaning that almost all remaining public health orders (including the mask mandate) were withdrawn.

A major outbreak occurred in the Hatchet Lake Dene Nation, which on July 8 contributed to Saskatchewan's largest single-day increase in cases (113) since early-June.

In late-July, another major outbreak was reported in the Buffalo River Dene Nation, which by July 23 had reached 65 cases. The NITHA believed that evacuation efforts for wildfires in the region (where 250 residents were sheltered in hotel rooms in Lloydminster), and complacency following the lifting of public health orders, were factors in the outbreak.   Chief Elmer Campbell believed the outbreak was imported by residents travelling to larger centres for supplies during the evacuation, but also criticized the province's lifting of restrictions without factoring in low vaccination rates in Northern Saskatchewan, and demanded that enforceable public health orders be reinstated in the region in order to control the outbreak. Campbell argued that "Facebook doctors" spreading misinformation had led to anti-vaccination rhetoric in the region, despite its best efforts to incentivize vaccination.

By July 30, the North zones accounted for nearly half of Saskatchewan's active cases, which had doubled in the past 10 days. The province reported that the majority of new cases in July were among individuals who were not vaccinated.

August 
By August, the number of new first doses had largely stalled, and the province had discontinued regular communications regarding COVID-19 (including press conferences and the daily press releases summarizing case and vaccination statistics). On August 11, it was reported that the Ministry of Health was evaluating a request by officials in Saskatchewan's northern regions—which were leading the country in new cases per-100,000—to reinstate enforceable public health orders on a regional basis to control the current surges in the region. On August 12, Saskatchewan reported 141 new cases—the province's largest single-day increase since late-May—with the majority of new cases being within the Far North, Saskatoon, and South East regions. Saskatoon's medical health officer declared that a fourth wave had begun in the area. 

By August 22, the seven-day average reached 166, and the province had over 1,500 active cases—the majority of which being within the Saskatoon zone. On August 23, the SHA announced that case numbers would not be released that day due to unspecified issues. The next day, the province announced that 255 tests had been rendered "invalid" due to instrument issues at the Roy Romanow Provincial Laboratory, and that the affected individuals had been retested. 206 of the new tests had a different result from the first test, and 54 of the invalid tests were false positives involving residents of long-term care homes in Regina.

By late-August, there were calls by medical officials for mitigations such as mandatory masks, reinstating mandatory self-isolation for positive cases and close contacts, and mandatory vaccination of health care workers, provincial employees, and municipal employees, citing the fourth wave and Saskatchewan's reluctance to reinstate public health measures. On August 30, after the Saskatchewan Roughriders football team announced plans to mandate that spectators be fully-vaccinated, Moe reiterated that the province would work with and develop solutions (such as a digital proof of vaccination) for entities who voluntarily choose to require vaccination, but that the province will not issue public health orders restricting businesses or activities to the fully-vaccinated (as have provinces such as B.C. and Manitoba).

September 
On September 10, Saskatchewan reported 432 new cases; it was the province's largest single-day increase of 2021, and its second-largest increase overall. 363 of the cases were among individuals who were not vaccinated, and 34% were among residents 19 and younger. Premier Moe announced that the province would expand its testing and contact tracing resources (including contracting private providers, and having ordered new shipments of rapid test kits), and reinstate mandatory self-isolation for unvaccinated positive cases and close contacts. The SHA stated that it would reduce elective medical services in order to provide additional capacity. Moe once again ruled out the restoration of any other public health measure such as mandatory masking, as he considered them to be stopgaps until the availability of vaccines.

On September 13, Saskatchewan surpassed 200 hospitalizations for the first time since April 2021, and reported 449 new cases—its largest single-day increase to-date, and largest since November 2020. 89% of new cases were among individuals who were not vaccinated. This was exceeded the next day with 506 new cases, with the majority being in the Far North East, North West, North Central, and Saskatoon zones, 436 of them being among unvaccinated residents, and 101 reported to be among children younger than 12 (who are currently ineligible for COVID-19 vaccines). 

On September 16, Premier Moe announced the reinstatement of the provincial mask mandate, as well as plans to begin mandating proof of vaccination for certain activities beginning in October. Moe stated that "the time for patience is now over. The choice to not get vaccinated is not just affecting you, it's now seriously impacting those who did do the right thing." On September 28, the SHA ceased offering COVID-19 testing for asymptomatic patients unless they are a close contact of a positive case, or had tested positive on an antigen test. On September 30, the province reported over 600 new cases in a day for the first time, and neared 700 deaths in total.

October 
On October 1, presentation of a proof of vaccination or recent negative test became mandatory in order to be admitted to dine-in restaurants, event and entertainment facilities, ticketed sporting events, gyms, and retail liquor and cannabis stores.

On October 5, Saskatchewan set a new record for current COVID-19 hospitalizations for the third day in a row, having increased to 340, with 73 in an ICU, and 76% not being fully vaccinated. On October 7, Premier Moe announced that responsibility for Saskatchewan's response to the pandemic would be transferred to the Provincial Emergency Operations Centre (PEOC), to "better coordinate the pandemic response between government ministries and our healthcare delivery." The PEOC will establish a joint team consisting of members of the Ministry of Health and the SHA, and be responsible for management of staffing and all future public communications (including media briefings) regarding COVID-19 moving forward.

On October 17, Saskatchewan exceeded 84 COVID-19 patients in ICU–its largest number to-date. On October 20, the SHA released modelling projecting that the current hospitalization surge would extend into 2022 without additional public health measures, but that a scenario with a combination of vaccine boosters for vulnerable populations and a 28-day reduction in population mixing (whether voluntary or mandated via public health order) would have the greatest impact on reducing ICU numbers. It was stated that 68% of hospitalizations were patients who were not vaccinated at all, and nearly half of hospitalizations formally received their positive test upon or after admission.

In an SHA physicians' town hall on October 21, it was stated that Saskatchewan had the most ICU patients per-capita out of all Canadian provinces, and that provincial ICU capacity in total had reached its "red zone" of between 116 and 149 patients, which would necessitate the transfer of patients out-of-province. Saskatchewan reached agreements to transfer ICU patients to hospitals in Ontario. 

During a speech on October 25, Premier Moe stated that "we’ve been hit hard by a fourth wave of this pandemic and there are pressures in our health care system", but that cases were trending downward due to vaccination progress and the new proof of vaccination requirements (which he credited with a 7% increase in vaccine administered since the announcement), and that there would be no new public health restrictions as they would be unfair to the vaccinated. Opposition Leader Meili criticized the speech as a "slap in the face", accusing Moe of downplaying Saskatchewan's high case rate, low vaccination rate, fatalities, and having to send ICU patients out of province and receive assistance from the Canadian Armed Forces. On October 26, a health official told CTV News Regina that the actual number of positive cases in Saskatchewan may be underreported due to high test positivity and a decline in the number of tests administered.

December 
On December 16, the province announced that all adults that had received a second  COVID-19 vaccine dose at least three months prior would become eligible to receive booster doses beginning December 20.

By December 2021, Saskatchewan's daily case numbers and hospitalizations had seen a decline to levels not seen since August 2021. However, with the arrival of Omicron variant in the province, cases began to once again escalate by the end of the month, but hospitalizations continued to slowly decline in comparison to their earlier peak. A total of 896 cases were reported between December 24 and 28 (during which the SHA did not publish daily summaries due to the Christmas holiday), with increasing spread of Omicron variant province-wide, and especially in Regina and Saskatoon. 

While the Saskatchewan government had considered reimplementing restrictions on gatherings over the holiday period (as have all other provinces) to control the spread of Omicron variant, the province did not implement any new restrictions. However, Shahab recommended that residents keep gatherings "small and consistent", and "be very cautious with large gatherings". 

On December 30, Premier Moe announced that the province would not implement new public health orders at this time, and would (against the current recommendations of the Public Health Agency of Canada, but in line with new guidance issued by the U.S. CDC earlier that week) reduce the mandatory self-isolation period for COVID-19 positives who are fully-vaccinated (two doses) from ten to five days. The province will also no longer recommend PCR testing of asymptomatic individuals.

2022

January 
Spread of Omicron variant contributed to record increases in cases, with Saskatchewan reporting at least 900 cases per-day from January 6 onward, and reporting over a thousand new cases for the first time on January 7. That day, Shahab warned that Omicron variant was causing an exponential increase in cases, and recommended that residents reduce their non-essential contacts for at least the next two to four weeks, and against non-essential travel between communities to protect against importation of infections. However, the province did not introduce binding public health orders to enforce these recommendations. 

During a press briefing on January 12, Moe renewed the existing proof of vaccination and mask mandates through February 28, and once again did not impose any new public health orders, arguing that he didn't think it was "necessary" due to the province's hospitalizations, and that this was "in large part due to what Saskatchewan people are doing." Moe also commented upon an announcement by Quebecois counterpart François Legault that the province planned to begin charging a significant "contribution" to residents who have not received at least one vaccine dose, vowing that he would not implement such a scheme in Saskatchewan. A day later, Premier Moe revealed that he had tested positive for COVID-19 on a rapid test.

On January 21, Shahab stated that "several anomalies" in the province's reporting system had caused COVID-19 deaths and recoveries to be underreported since the start of 2022, resulting in a one-time increase of nine additional deaths that had not yet been accounted for. Even then, Moe still ruled out any additional public health orders, arguing that Saskatchewan still had "the lowest per-capita COVID-19 fatality rate in Canada for the month of January, below provinces that have introduced the strictest lockdown policies." 

On January 24, Saskatchewan exceeded a total of 262 COVID-19-related hospitalizations (with nearly half being incidental); the province stated that it planned to re-locate some patients to rural hospitals in order to balance the load of Regina and Saskatoon's hospitals. Merriman stated that admissions had been "fairly stable", and "seem to be leveling out".

On January 27, after Moe stated the previous day that the province was considering easing restrictions soon, Merriman announced a number of changes to provincial COVID-19 protocol to reflect Omicron variant and the wide availability of rapid testing. The mandatory self-isolation period for COVID-19 positives was shortened to five days for those who are not fully-vaccinated, while close contacts of a positive case are no longer required to self-isolate, but will still be instructed to monitor for infection and symptoms using rapid tests.

On January 29, Moe issued a letter in support of Freedom Convoy 2022 (a protest against vaccine mandates for essential workers entering Canada via land crossings, whose organizers are largely linked to far-right political parties and organizations), also stating that he planned to lift the proof of vaccination mandate "in the not too-distant future" because the COVID-19 vaccines were not preventing people from being infected with or transmitting COVID-19. His remarks were met with criticism from doctors and other officials, while Saskatchewan NDP leader Ryan Meili accused Moe of spreading misinformation and declaring an intent to prematurely lift public health orders in order to appease "fringe groups". Moe clarified his comments on January 31, arguing that the present vaccines were not as effective at diminishing transmission of Omicron variant.

Alexander Wong of the Regina General Hospital argued that Moe's assessment of incidence rates between vaccinated and unvaccinated cases as being nearly equal was affected by a base rate fallacy (the percentage of the unvaccinated population testing positive still being higher than the percentage of the vaccinated population), but that Saskatchewan's case numbers were also skewed by the provincial policy of only recommending PCR testing of those who are symptomatic or have comorbidities.

On January 31, hospitalizations with COVID-19 in Saskatchewan hit an all-time high of 363, although 179 were classified as "incidental" (a patient having tested positive for COVID-19 but not originally admitted for it).

February 
On February 3, the province announced that it will further phase out COVID-19 testing and reporting of cases effective immediately. PCR tests will only be available to those who are hospitalized or considered high-risk (including confirmatory testing for health care workers), and public testing sites will be closed effective February 7. In addition, the province will cease daily reports and statistics, and only publish a weekly summary. On February 8, as previously promised, Moe announced that the proof of vaccination mandate would be lifted effective February 14, and that the indoor mask mandate would be lifted by the end of the month.

March

April 
During question period on April 25, members of the Saskatchewan NDP accused the government of lacking transparency in its current response to COVID-19, and that it was "wreaking havoc in our health system and in our emergency rooms". Merriman denied that the province was "downplaying" the pandemic, and argued that "most of the challenges that we have in our healthcare system are human resource related", citing that the majority of surgeries in Regina and Saskatoon were occurring as scheduled.

See also 

 Timeline of the COVID-19 pandemic in Canada

References 

SaskatchewanTimeline
Coronavirus pandemic
Coronavirus, Timeline
SaskatchewanTimeline
2021 in Saskatchewan
SaskatchewanTimeline
Saskatchewan